Paralimna punctipennis is a species of shore flies (insects in the family Ephydridae).

Distribution
United States.

References

Ephydridae
Insects described in 1830
Taxa named by Christian Rudolph Wilhelm Wiedemann
Diptera of North America